Wolfgang Kromp (born 17 September 1970) is an Austrian ice hockey player. He competed in the men's tournaments at the 1994 Winter Olympics, the 1998 Winter Olympics and the 2002 Winter Olympics.

Career statistics

Regular season and playoffs

International

References

External links
 

1970 births
Living people
Olympic ice hockey players of Austria
Ice hockey players at the 1994 Winter Olympics
Ice hockey players at the 1998 Winter Olympics
Ice hockey players at the 2002 Winter Olympics
Sportspeople from Villach